FSU may refer to:

Florida State University, a large public research university in Tallahassee, Florida
Ferris State University, Michigan
Frostburg State University, Maryland
Fayetteville State University, North Carolina
Fairmont State University, West Virginia
Fitchburg State University, Massachusetts
Framingham State University, Massachusetts
Friends Stand United, street gang
Finance Sector Union, Australian trade union
Financial Services Union, Irish trade union
Fédération Syndicale Unitaire, French trade union
Former Soviet Union, collective term for the fifteen countries that formed the Soviet Union until 1991
Fuse-Switch-Unit, opposite of SFU, relating to the order an electrical fuse is inserted in a circuit

See also
California State University, Fresno, also known as Fresno State University
University of Jena, also known as Friedrich Schiller University, Thuringia, Germany